Ave Maria is the first classical, and the fifth studio album released by the Finnish soprano Tarja Turunen.

On the 22 July 2015, earMUSIC released a video announcing the existence of the album, following with a teaser trailer on 6 August. The full music video was not released until 13 August that year, with Tarja singing the rare "Ave Maria" by Paolo Tosti.

Background
In an interview with Winter Storm Slovakia, Tarja talked a little about the recording sessions :

"All the musicians performed the songs together with me without an audience" and continues saying "Nothing has been edited nor any studio tricks have been used" and finishes with "So what you hear on the record, is purely how the songs sounded in Lakeuden Risti church during the recording session."

She also says that this is a very important album to her, since "It represents her long background in classical music and her knowledge as a lyrical singer".

Track listing

Musicians 
 Tarja Turunen – soprano
 Kalevi Kiviniemi – organ
 Marius Järvi – cello
 Kirsi Kiviharju – harp

Chart performance

References

External links
 Tarja-Ave Maria Microsite
 Tarja Turunen Official Website
 

2015 albums
Tarja Turunen albums